The Malaysian Philharmonic Orchestra (MPO) is a Malaysian orchestra based in Kuala Lumpur.  The orchestra is resident at the Petronas Philharmonic Hall (Dewan Filharmonik Petronas). It is one of Asia's leading orchestras and is praised for its musical qualities.

The patron of the MPO is Tun Siti Hasmah Mohamad Ali, wife of the former Prime Minister of Malaysia, Mahathir bin Mohamad, who was the prime minister when the orchestra was founded in 1997. The orchestra is funded primarily through Petronas, a Malaysian oil and gas company.

Background
Founded in 1997, the MPO made its debut concert on 17 August 1998 under the direction of its first music director and founder, Kees Bakels. In July 2003, Bakels announced his intention to stand down as music director for health reasons. In September 2003, the MPO appointed James Judd to succeed Bakels, effective with the 2004–2005 season. However, on 14 June 2004, the MPO issued a press announcement that "all contractual relationships between MPO and Mr. Judd have ceased with effect from 7 April 2004", without a formal explanation, with the result that Judd never took up the MPO post.  Bakels subsequently remained as MPO music director through the end of the 2004–2005 season.  Bakels subsequently took the title of conductor laureate of the MPO.

In November 2004, Matthias Bamert was named the new MPO's principal conductor, starting from August 2005. Bamert held the post until the end of the 2007–2008 season.  Claus Peter Flor was the MPO's music director, starting from August 2008, with an initial contract of 3 years.  Flor continued as music director until the end of the 2013–2014 season.  Fabio Mechetti then served as MPO principal conductor for the 2014–2015 season, and stood down from the post in October 2015.

Dato' Seri Ooi Chean See was the founding Resident Conductor of the Malaysian Philharmonic Orchestra from 1998 until 2006. The position remained vacant until Ciarán McAuley held the position from 2014 to 2016. Naohisa Furusawa, a member of the MPO double bass section since January 2003, was named Resident Conductor in 2016. Gerard Salonga was appointed as an additional Resident Conductor in 2018.

In 2018, Jun Märkl first guest-conducted the MPO.  He returned for further guest-conducting engagements twice in 2019, and in March 2020.  In December 2020, the MPO announced the appointment of Märkl as its next music director, effective with the 2021 season.

Recordings
To date, the MPO has made 17 recordings under 3 labels.

Controversies
During Flor's music directorship, nine musicians on fixed-term contracts which expired on 15 August 2012 had been dismissed from the orchestra. The case led to calls to boycott auditions for the orchestra.  On 15 February 2012, the MPO sent notices to the nine musicians to officially notify that their contracts will not be renewed. Seven out of the nine musicians who received the non-renewal notices filed a legal suit against the MPO at the Malaysian Industrial Court, challenging their former employer's decision not to extend their contracts. The musicians were Toko Inomoto (violist), Brian C. Larson (violinist), Paul Andrew Philbert (timpanist), Darcey Layne Timmerman (percussionist), Kevin Hugh Thompson (trombonist), Markus Gundermann (violinist) and Liu Jian (violinist).

In 2015, Malaysian Industrial Court threw out their dismissal suit, citing that the musicians’ fixed term contracts had naturally expired, and therefore, the MPO had not even needed to dismiss them. The court opined that the case is not considered 'sacking' or 'dismissal' but merely not extending the expired contract, which is common in many industries.

Music directors and principal conductors
 Kees Bakels (1998–2005, Music Director)
 Matthias Bamert (2005–2008, Principal Conductor)
 Claus Peter Flor (2008–2014, Music Director)
 Fabio Mechetti (2014–2015, Principal Conductor)
 Jun Märkl (Music Director-designate, effective 2021)

Resident conductors
 Ooi Chean See (1998-2006)
 Ciarán McAuley (2014–2016)
 Naohisa Furusawa (2016–present)
 Gerard Salonga (2018–present)

See also
 Malaysian Philharmonic Youth Orchestra

References

External links
 Malaysian Philharmonic Orchestra official website
 Malaysian Property Partners - Malaysian Philharmonic
 "Criticisms on MPO, baseless".  The Mole blog, undated entry

Malaysian orchestras
Symphony orchestras
Musical groups established in 1997
1997 establishments in Malaysia